"Without Me" is a song by American rapper Eminem from his fourth studio album The Eminem Show (2002). "Without Me" was released on May 15, 2002, as the lead single from the album, and re-released on his greatest hits compilation album Curtain Call: The Hits (2005). "Without Me" is one of Eminem's most successful singles, reaching number two on the U.S. Billboard Hot 100, and number one in fifteen countries.

Content
The song was Eminem's return after the successful Marshall Mathers LP, intended as a sequel to "The Real Slim Shady" and essentially says that he is back to save the world. It also refers to Eminem's role in the music industry and his effect on culture.

The song mocks a number of Eminem's critics, including then-Vice-president Dick Cheney (including his recurring heart problems) and his wife Lynne, the FCC, Chris Kirkpatrick (of NSYNC), Limp Bizkit and Moby, as well as parodying Prince's decision to change his name to a symbol. It also lampoons comparisons of him to Elvis Presley as a white man succeeding commercially in a predominantly black art form. A line also attacks his mother Debbie Mathers for the lawsuit she filed for the lyrics of his breakthrough hit "My Name Is".

The opening lyric "Two trailer park girls go round the outside" is based on the country rap single "Buffalo Gals" by Malcolm McLaren. The introduction—"Obie Trice, real name, no gimmicks"—is sampled from Obie Trice's own track "Rap Name".

Critical reception
Stephen Thomas Erlewine marked it as one of the best tracks on The Eminem Show. David Browne was positive: "'I've created a monster, 'cuz no one wants to hear Marshall no more,' he (Eminem) whines, partly in jest, in the beat-crazy single 'Without Me'." HipHopDX noted that the blazing single "Without Me" is one of the only light-hearted songs on the album. NME magazine noted that this song is "tackling disco." RapReviews wrote: "His fearlessness continues on the lead single "Without Me" when he lambasts everyone from Dick Cheney's wife to the leading electronic artists of the day." Kris Ex exclaims: ""Without Me"—like his "The Real Slim Shady," the leadoff single from 2000's The Marshall Mathers LP—is a fun-loving, barb-laden romp on which he flits from one topic to the next like a bumblebee with ADD."

Chart performances and awards
"Without Me" is one of Eminem's most successful singles. The song reached the number one position in the charts in numerous countries, including United Kingdom, Australia, Ireland, and New Zealand for 7 weeks. In the United States, the song reached a peak of number two on the Billboard Hot 100 behind "Hot in Herre" by Nelly, although it reached number one on both the Mainstream Top 40 and Rhythmic charts.

"Without Me" was nominated for Record of the Year at the Grammy Awards of 2003 (losing to Norah Jones's song "Don't Know Why"), being Eminem's first song to receive a Grammy nomination in a major category. It also received a nomination for Best Male Rap Solo Performance but lost that award as well to the song "Hot in Herre" by rapper Nelly.

In 2009, the song was honored by Pitchfork Media as the 251st-greatest song of the 2000s.

The song was the 69th-best-selling single of the 2000s in United Kingdom.

Music video
The song's music video features a number of scenarios built around its context, including Eminem and Dr. Dre as parodies of comics in general, specifically Batman, Robin (Rap Boy), and Blade trying to save a child who bought a copy of The Eminem Show that has a Parental Advisory sticker. Eminem and his band of heroes rush to the rescue before the child puts the CD in his CD player and when they arrive Rap Boy snatches it away from him, showing that his CD has explicit lyrics that are not suitable for him to listen to. The kid cries and is upset after Rap Boy and Blade (Dr. Dre) confiscate the album away from him. The video was shot from April 12–13 at Barwick Studios. The comic and the scene with Moby feature a rabbit costume, a possible reference to the one featured in two Love Inc. music videos. As of May 2022, the music video has over 1.4 billion views. 

This video received MTV Video Music Awards for Video of the Year, Best Male Video, Best Rap Video, and Best Direction (for Joseph Kahn), as well as gaining nominations for Best Editing and Viewer's Choice. It also won Best Short Form Music Video at the Grammy Awards of 2003.

Track listing
European CD single

UK CD single

Australian CD single

Notes
 signifies a co-Record producer.
 signifies an additional producer.

Charts

Weekly charts

Year-end charts 

|+2002 year-end chart performance for "Without Me"
|-

|-

|-

|-

|-

|-
! scope="row"| Canada (Nielsen SoundScan)
| 67
|-
!scope="row"| Canada (Nielsen SoundScan)
|111
|-
! scope="row"| Europe (Eurochart Hot 100)
|3
|-

|-
!scope="row"|France (SNEP)
| style="text-align:center;"|15
|-
!scope="row"|Germany (Official German Charts)
| style="text-align:center;"|4
|-

|-
!scope="row"|Italy (FIMI)
|12
|-
!scope="row"|Netherlands (Dutch Top 40)
| style="text-align:center;"|18
|-

|-
!scope="row"|New Zealand (Recorded Music NZ)
| style="text-align:center;"|4
|-
!scope="row"|Sweden (Sverigetopplistan)
| style="text-align:center;"|6
|-

|-
!scope="row"|UK Singles (OCC)
| style="text-align:center;"|10
|-
!scope="row"|US Billboard Hot 100
| style="text-align:center;"|21
|-
! scope="row"| US Hot R&B/Hip-Hop Songs (Billboard)
| 79
|-

|+2022 year-end chart performance for "Without Me"
|-

|-
! scope="row"| Australia (ARIA)
| 56
|-
! scope="row"| Global 200 (Billboard)
| 63
|-
! scope="row"| Lithuania (AGATA)
| 35
|-
! scope="row"| Switzerland (Schweizer Hitparade)
| 89
|-

Decade-end charts

Certifications and sales

In popular culture

 In September 2002, the Fox Network sketch comedy show MadTV featured a parody title "What's on TV", featuring Josh Meyers impersonating Eminem.
 In December 2002, Nickelodeon's flagship sketch comedy show All That created a parody video of this song, entitled "Without Meat".
 The song is included in the soundtrack for the 2016 film Suicide Squad.
 The song is also featured in the dance rhythm game, Just Dance 2021.
 The song was also used in the trailer for Despicable Me 2.
 The teaser and trailer for the 2020 mockumentary/comedy Borat Subsequent Moviefilm produced by British comedian Sacha Baron Cohen features a brief Kazakh iteration of the song.
 The song was parodied on Saturday Night Live with a song named "NFTs" with Pete Davidson as Eminem, Chris Redd as Dr. Dre, and a cameo by Jack Harlow.
 Attorney Alex Spiro in a court filing for Elon Musk against SEC to rescind SEC decree requiring Musk's tweets about Tesla to be reviewed before posting, quoted "(SEC) won’t let me be or let me be me so let me see; They tried to shut me down", replacing FCC with SEC.

See also 
 List of best-selling singles in Australia

References

External links

2002 singles
2002 songs
Eminem songs
Music videos directed by Joseph Kahn
Number-one singles in Australia
Number-one singles in Austria
Ultratop 50 Singles (Wallonia) number-one singles
Number-one singles in Denmark
European Hot 100 Singles number-one singles
Number-one singles in Germany
Irish Singles Chart number-one singles
Dutch Top 40 number-one singles
Number-one singles in New Zealand
Number-one singles in Norway
Number-one singles in Scotland
Number-one singles in Sweden
Number-one singles in Switzerland
UK Singles Chart number-one singles
MTV Video of the Year Award
MTV Video Music Award for Best Male Video
MTV Video Music Award for Best Direction
Songs written by Eminem
Song recordings produced by Eminem
Songs about censorship
Grammy Award for Best Short Form Music Video
Shady Records singles
Aftermath Entertainment singles
Interscope Records singles
Comedy rap songs
Cultural depictions of Elvis Presley
Cultural depictions of Osama bin Laden
Cultural depictions of Dick Cheney
Parody superheroes
Songs written by Malcolm McLaren
Songs written by Jeff Bass
American hip hop songs
Obscenity controversies in music
Songs about comics
Songs about hip hop
Songs about fictional male characters